The 1987 World Chess Championship was played between Anatoly Karpov and Garry Kasparov in Seville from October 12 to December 19, 1987. Before the 24th game, Kasparov was down 12–11, but in the 24th game, Kasparov made a comeback by using the English Opening to win the final game to retain his title.

1985 Interzonal tournaments

Three Interzonal tournaments were held in 1985 in Tunis, Taxco, and Biel, with four players qualifying from each.

{| class="wikitable"
|+ April–May 1985 Interzonal, Tunis
|-
!  !! !! Rating !! 1 !! 2 !! 3 !! 4 !! 5 !! 6 !! 7 !! 8 !! 9 !! 10 !! 11 !! 12 !! 13 !! 14 !! 15 !! 16 !! 17 !! Total !! Tie break
|- style="background:#ccffcc;"
| 1 || align=left| || 2590 || - || ½ || 1 || 1 || ½ || ½ || 1 || ½ || ½ || ½ || ½ || 1 || 1 || ½ || 1 || ½ || 1 || 11½ || 
|- style="background:#ccffcc;"
| 2 || align=left| || 2635 || ½ || - || ½ || ½ || 1 || ½ || ½ || 1 || 1 || ½ || ½ || 1 || 0 || ½ || 1 || 1 || 1 || 11 || 
|- style="background:#ccffcc;"
| 3 || align=left| || 2635 || 0 || ½ || - || ½ || 1 || ½ || ½ || ½ || ½ || ½ || 1 || ½ || 1 || ½ || ½ || 1 || 1 || 10½ || 
|-
| 4 || align=left| || 2550 || 0 || ½ || ½ || - || ½ || 0 || ½ || ½ || 1 || ½ || 1 || ½ || ½ || 1 || ½ || 1 || 1 || 9½ || 66.75
|- style="background:#ccffcc;"
| 5 || align=left| || 2495 || ½ || 0 || 0 || ½ || - || ½ || ½ || 1 || 0 || ½ || ½ || 1 || ½ || 1 || 1 || 1 || 1 || 9½ || 65.75
|-
| 6 || align=left| || 2560 || ½ || ½ || ½ || 1 || ½ || - || ½ || ½ || 0 || ½ || ½ || ½ || ½ || 1 || 0 || 1 || 1 || 9 || 66.25
|-
| 7 || align=left| || 2535 || 0 || ½ || ½ || ½ || ½ || ½ || - || ½ || ½ || ½ || ½ || ½ || ½ || ½ || 1 || 1 || 1 || 9 || 63.25
|-
| 8 || align=left| || 2485 || ½ || 0 || ½ || ½ || 0 || ½ || ½ || - || ½ || ½ || 1 || ½ || ½ || 1 || ½ || 1 || 1 || 9 || 62.75
|-
| 9 || align=left| || 2540 || ½ || 0 || ½ || 0 || 1 || 1 || ½ || ½ || - || 1 || 0 || ½ || ½ || 1 || 0 || ½ || 1 || 8½ || 
|-
| 10 || align=left| || 2575 || ½ || ½ || ½ || ½ || ½ || ½ || ½ || ½ || 0 || - || 1 || 0 || ½ || 0 || ½ || 1 || 1 || 8 || 58.75
|-
| 11 || align=left| || 2465 || ½ || ½ || 0 || 0 || ½ || ½ || ½ || 0 || 1 || 0 || - || 0 || 1 || ½ || 1 || 1 || 1 || 8 || 55.25
|-
| 12 || align=left| || 2570 || 0 || 0 || ½ || ½ || 0 || ½ || ½ || ½ || ½ || 1 || 1 || - || ½ || 0 || ½ || 1 || 1 || 8 || 55.00
|-
| 13 || align=left| || 2450 || 0 || 1 || 0 || ½ || ½ || ½ || ½ || ½ || ½ || ½ || 0 || ½ || - || ½ || 1 || ½ || ½ || 7½ || 
|-
| 14 || align=left| || 2535 || ½ || ½ || ½ || 0 || 0 || 0 || ½ || 0 || 0 || 1 || ½ || 1 || ½ || - || ½ || ½ || ½ || 6½ || 50.00
|-
| 15 || align=left| || 2515 || 0 || 0 || ½ || ½ || 0 || 1 || 0 || ½ || 1 || ½ || 0 || ½ || 0 || ½ || - || ½ || 1 || 6½ || 45.75
|-
| 16 || align=left| || 2370 || ½ || 0 || 0 || 0 || 0 || 0 || 0 || 0 || ½ || 0 || 0 || 0 || ½ || ½ || ½ || - || 1 || 3½ || 
|-
| 17 || align=left| || 2285 || 0 || 0 || 0 || 0 || 0 || 0 || 0 || 0 || 0 || 0 || 0 || 0 || ½ || ½ || 0 || 0 || - || 1 || 
|}

Yusupov, Beliavsky, and Portisch qualified outright, while Chernin beat Gavrikov 3½-2½ in a Moscow playoff to take the fourth spot. Slim Bouaziz also started the tournament, but withdrew after six rounds, having drawn only one game and lost the rest. His results are not counted in the table above.

{| class="wikitable"
|+ June 1985 Interzonal, Taxco
|-
!  !! !! Rating !! 1 !! 2 !! 3 !! 4 !! 5 !! 6 !! 7 !! 8 !! 9 !! 10 !! 11 !! 12 !! 13 !! 14 !! 15 !! 16 !! Total !! Tie break
|- style="background:#ccffcc;"
| 1 || align=left| || 2650 || - || ½ || ½ || ½ || 1 || 1 || 1 || 1 || ½ || ½ || 1 || 1 || 1 || 1 || ½ || 1* || 12 || 
|- style="background:#ccffcc;"
| 2 || align=left| || 2545 || ½ || - || ½ || 1 || ½ || ½ || ½ || 1 || 1 || ½ || ½ || 1 || ½ || ½ || 1 || 1* || 10½ || 
|- style="background:#ccffcc;"
| 3 || align=left| || 2565 || ½ || ½ || - || ½ || ½ || ½ || ½ || ½ || ½ || 1 || ½ || ½ || 1 || 1 || 1 || 1* || 10 || 
|- style="background:#ccffcc;"
| 4 || align=left| || 2560 || ½ || 0 || ½ || - || 1 || ½ || ½ || 1 || ½ || ½ || ½ || ½ || ½ || 1 || 1 || ½ || 9 || 
|-
| 5 || align=left| || 2530 || 0 || ½ || ½ || 0 || - || ½ || ½ || 1 || 1 || ½ || 0 || ½ || 1 || ½ || 1 || ½ || 8 || 
|-
| 6 || align=left| || 2500 || 0 || ½ || ½ || ½ || ½ || - || ½ || ½ || ½ || ½ || 1 || ½ || 1 || ½ || 0 || ½ || 7½ || 54.00
|-
| 7 || align=left| || 2485 || 0 || ½ || ½ || ½ || ½ || ½ || - || 0 || 0 || 1 || 1 || ½ || 0 || ½ || 1 || 1 || 7½ || 51.75
|-
| 8 || align=left| || 2535 || 0 || 0 || ½ || 0 || 0 || ½ || 1 || - || ½ || ½ || ½ || ½ || ½ || 1 || 1 || ½ || 7 || 
|-
| 9 || align=left| || 2530 || ½ || 0 || ½ || ½ || 0 || ½ || 1 || ½ || - || ½ || 1 || ½ || 0 || 0 || ½ || ½ || 6½ || 48.25
|-
| 10 || align=left| || 2540 || ½ || ½ || 0 || ½ || ½ || ½ || 0 || ½ || ½ || - || 0 || ½ || 1 || 0 || 1 || ½ || 6½ || 47.75
|-
| 11 || align=left| || 2440 || 0 || ½ || ½ || ½ || 1 || 0 || 0 || ½ || 0 || 1 || - || 1 || 0 || 0 || ½ || 1 || 6½ || 46.50
|-
| 12 || align=left| || 2570 || 0 || 0 || ½ || ½ || ½ || ½ || ½ || ½ || ½ || ½ || 0 || - || ½ || 1 || 1 || 0 || 6½ || 45.75
|-
| 13 || align=left| || 2470 || 0 || ½ || 0 || ½ || 0 || 0 || 1 || ½ || 1 || 0 || 1 || ½ || - || ½ || 0 || 1* || 6½ || 44.50
|-
| 14 || align=left| || 2430 || 0 || ½ || 0 || 0 || ½ || ½ || ½ || 0 || 1 || 1 || 1 || 0 || ½ || - || 0 || ½ || 6 || 
|-
| 15 || align=left| || 2400 || ½ || 0 || 0 || 0 || 0 || 1 || 0 || 0 || ½ || 0 || ½ || 0 || 1 || 1 || - || 1 || 5½ || 
|-
| 16 || align=left| || 2495 || 0* || 0* || 0* || ½ || ½ || ½ || 0 || ½ || ½ || ½ || 0 || 1 || 0* || ½ || 0 || - || 4½ || 
|}

Balashov withdrew after 11 rounds. His last four unplayed games are marked with an asterisk (*).

{| class="wikitable"
|+ July 1985 Interzonal, Biel
|-
!  !! !! Rating !! 1 !! 2 !! 3 !! 4 !! 5 !! 6 !! 7 !! 8 !! 9 !! 10 !! 11 !! 12 !! 13 !! 14 !! 15 !! 16 !! 17 !! 18 !! Total !! Tie break
|- style="background:#ccffcc;"
| 1 || align=left| || 2625 || - || ½ || ½ || 1 || 1 || ½ || ½ || ½ || ½ || ½ || ½ || ½ || 1 || 1 || 1 || 1 || 1 || 1 || 12½ || 
|- style="background:#ccffcc;"
| 2 || align=left| || 2570 || ½ || - || ½ || ½ || ½ || ½ || 0 || ½ || ½ || ½ || 1 || 1 || 1 || ½ || 1 || 1 || 1 || 1 || 11½ || 
|- style="background:#ccffcc;"
| 3 || align=left| || 2555 || ½ || ½ || - || ½ || 0 || ½ || ½ || ½ || ½ || ½ || 1 || ½ || 1 || ½ || 1 || 1 || 1 || 1 || 11 || 
|- style="background:#ccffcc;"
| 4 || align=left| || 2575 || 0 || ½ || ½ || - || 1 || 1 || 0 || ½ || ½ || 1 || ½ || ½ || 1 || 1 || ½ || ½ || ½ || 1 || 10½ || 83.75
|-
| 5 || align=left| || 2520 || 0 || ½ || 1 || 0 || - || 0 || 1 || ½ || ½ || ½ || 1 || 1 || 1 || ½ || 1 || ½ || ½ || 1 || 10½ || 81.25
|-
| 6 || align=left| || 2535 || ½ || ½ || ½ || 0 || 1 || - || ½ || 0 || ½ || ½ || 0 || 1 || 1 || 1 || 1 || ½ || 1 || 1 || 10½ || 80.50
|-
| 7 || align=left| || 2600 || ½ || 1 || ½ || 1 || 0 || ½ || - || 1 || ½ || 1 || 0 || ½ || 0 || ½ || 0 || ½ || 1 || 1 || 9½ || 79.00
|-
| 8 || align=left| || 2615 || ½ || ½ || ½ || ½ || ½ || 1 || 0 || - || ½ || 1 || ½ || ½ || ½ || ½ || ½ || ½ || 1 || ½ || 9½ || 78.25
|-
| 9 || align=left| || 2590 || ½ || ½ || ½ || ½ || ½ || ½ || ½ || ½ || - || ½ || ½ || ½ || ½ || ½ || 1 || ½ || 1 || ½ || 9½ || 77.00
|-
| 10 || align=left| || 2505 || ½ || ½ || ½ || 0 || ½ || ½ || 0 || 0 || ½ || - || ½ || 1 || 1 || ½ || 0 || ½ || ½ || 1 || 8 || 63.75
|-
| 11 || align=left| || 2535 || ½ || 0 || 0 || ½ || 0 || 1 || 1 || ½ || ½ || ½ || - || 0 || 0 || 1 || 0 || ½ || 1 || 1 || 8 || 62.50
|-
| 12 || align=left| || 2480 || ½ || 0 || ½ || ½ || 0 || 0 || ½ || ½ || ½ || 0 || 1 || - || 1 || ½ || 0 || 0 || 1 || 1 || 7½ || 57.75
|-
| 13 || align=left| || 2525 || 0 || 0 || 0 || 0 || 0 || 0 || 1 || ½ || ½ || 0 || 1 || 0 || - || 1 || 1 || 1 || 1 || ½ || 7½ || 52.25
|-
| 14 || align=left| || 2550 || 0 || ½ || ½ || 0 || ½ || 0 || ½ || ½ || ½ || ½ || 0 || ½ || 0 || - || 1 || 1 || ½ || ½ || 7 || 
|-
| 15 || align=left| || 2485 || 0 || 0 || 0 || ½ || 0 || 0 || 1 || ½ || 0 || 1 || 1 || 1 || 0 || 0 || - || 1 || ½ || 0 || 6½ || 
|-
| 16 || align=left| || 2465 || 0 || 0 || 0 || ½ || ½ || ½ || ½ || ½ || ½ || ½ || ½ || 1 || 0 || 0 || 0 || - || ½ || ½ || 6 || 
|-
| 17 || align=left| || 2425 || 0 || 0 || 0 || ½ || ½ || 0 || 0 || 0 || 0 || ½ || 0 || 0 || 0 || ½ || ½ || ½ || - || 1 || 4 || 
|-
| 18 || align=left| || 2430 || 0 || 0 || 0 || 0 || 0 || 0 || 0 || ½ || ½ || 0 || 0 || 0 || ½ || ½ || 1 || ½ || 0 || - || 3½ || 
|}

Short, van der Wiel, and Torre contested a playoff, also in Biel, for the fourth and final spot in the Candidates Tournament. Short and van der Wiel were tied with 3½ points each, while Torre scored 2 points, so Short qualified on a better tie break score from the main event.

The highest placed non-qualifying player from each Interzonal met in London in September 1985 to play for the position as first reserve in the Candidates Tournament. Speelman won with 4½ points, ahead of Gavrikov (4) and van der Wiel (3½). No reserve was needed, however.

1985–87 Candidates Tournament

The 12 qualifiers from the Interzonals were joined in the Candidates Tournament by three seeded players: Smyslov, Korchnoi, and Ribli (no. 2-4 from the previous tournament). The final spot went to Spassky, who was given a wild card by the organizers.

These 16 players first played a round-robin in Montpellier in October and November 1985, from which the top 4 would qualify for the knock-out phase.

{| class="wikitable"
|+ 1985 Candidates Tournament
|-
!  !! !! Rating !! 1 !! 2 !! 3 !! 4 !! 5 !! 6 !! 7 !! 8 !! 9 !! 10 !! 11 !! 12 !! 13 !! 14 !! 15 !! 16 !! Total !! Tie break
|- style="background:#ccffcc;"
| 1 || align=left| || 2600 || - || 0 || 1 || ½ || ½ || 1 || ½ || ½ || ½ || ½ || ½ || ½ || ½ || 1 || 1 || ½ || 9 || 65.75
|- style="background:#ccffcc;"
| 2 || align=left| || 2625 || 1 || - || ½ || 0 || ½ || 0 || ½ || ½ || ½ || ½ || ½ || 1 || 1 || ½ || 1 || 1 || 9 || 64.00
|- style="background:#ccffcc;"
| 3 || align=left| || 2555 || 0 || ½ || - || ½ || ½ || 0 || ½ || 1 || ½ || ½ || ½ || 1 || 1 || 1 || ½ || 1 || 9 || 63.25
|- style="background:#ccffcc;"
| 4 || align=left| || 2640 || ½ || 1 || ½ || - || ½ || 1 || ½ || ½ || ½ || 1 || 1 || 0 || ½ || ½ || ½ || 0 || 8½ || 65.25
|-
| 5 || align=left| || 2565 || ½ || ½ || ½ || ½ || - || ½ || ½ || ½ || 1 || 0 || ½ || ½ || 1 || 1 || ½ || ½ || 8½ || 62.50
|-
| 6 || align=left| || 2590 || 0 || 1 || 1 || 0 || ½ || - || ½ || ½ || ½ || 1 || ½ || ½ || ½ || ½ || 1 || 0 || 8 || 60.25
|-
| 7 || align=left| || 2640 || ½ || ½ || ½ || ½ || ½ || ½ || - || 0 || ½ || ½ || 1 || ½ || ½ || ½ || ½ || 1 || 8 || 58.25
|-
| 8 || align=left| || 2595 || ½ || ½ || 0 || ½ || ½ || ½ || 1 || - || ½ || ½ || ½ || ½ || ½ || ½ || 0 || 1 || 7½ || 55.25
|-
| 9 || align=left| || 2560 || ½ || ½ || ½ || ½ || 0 || ½ || ½ || ½ || - || ½ || ½ || ½ || ½ || ½ || ½ || 1 || 7½ || 54.50
|-
| 10 || align=left| || 2570 || ½ || ½ || ½ || 0 || 1 || 0 || ½ || ½ || ½ || - || 1 || ½ || 0 || ½ || ½ || ½ || 7 || 52.75
|-
| 11 || align=left| || 2575 || ½ || ½ || ½ || 0 || ½ || ½ || 0 || ½ || ½ || 0 || - || 1 || ½ || 1 || ½ || ½ || 7 || 51.50
|-
| 12 || align=left| || 2625 || ½ || 0 || 0 || 1 || ½ || ½ || ½ || ½ || ½ || ½ || 0 || - || 1 || 0 || ½ || 1 || 7 || 50.75
|-
| 13 || align=left| || 2630 || ½ || 0 || 0 || ½ || 0 || ½ || ½ || ½ || ½ || 1 || ½ || 0 || - || ½ || 1 || ½ || 6½ || 46.50
|-
| 14 || align=left| || 2605 || 0 || ½ || 0 || ½ || 0 || ½ || ½ || ½ || ½ || ½ || 0 || 1 || ½ || - || 1 || ½ || 6½ || 46.50
|-
| 15 || align=left| || 2545 || 0 || 0 || ½ || ½ || ½ || 0 || ½ || 1 || ½ || ½ || ½ || ½ || 0 || 0 || - || 1 || 6 || 
|-
| 16 || align=left| || 2550 || ½ || 0 || 0 || 1 || ½ || 1 || 0 || 0 || 0 || ½ || ½ || 0 || ½ || ½ || 0 || - || 5 || 
|}

A playoff match for fourth place was held after the main event. It ended 3-3, and Timman advanced because he had more wins during the tournament (4 against Tal's 3).

The top 4 from the round-robin played a series of matches in 1986, the winner of which (Sokolov) in turn got to play Anatoly Karpov in a final match in Linares to determine the championship challenger.

Karpov had earned the special privilege of being seeded directly into this match as part of the agreement regarding the controversial championship matches of 1984, 1985, and 1986.

{| class="wikitable" style="text-align:center"
|+Challenger Match February–March 1987
|-
! !! 1 !! 2 !! 3 !! 4 !! 5 !! 6 !! 7 !! 8 !! 9 !! 10 !! 11 !! Total
|-
| align=left | 
| ½ ||style="background:black; color:white"| 0 || ½ ||style="background:black; color:white"| ½ || ½ ||style="background:black; color:white"| 0 || ½ ||style="background:black; color:white"| ½ || ½ ||style="background:black; color:white"| 0 || 0 || 3½
|-
| align=left | 
|style="background:black; color:white"| ½ || 1 ||style="background:black; color:white"| ½ || ½ ||style="background:black; color:white"| ½ || 1 ||style="background:black; color:white"| ½ || ½ ||style="background:black; color:white"| ½ || 1 
|style="background:black; color:white"| 1 || 7½
|}

Karpov won, thus earning the right to face Kasparov in a championship match for the fourth year in a row.

1987 Championship match

The best-of-24 match was tied after 22 games. On his 50th move of game 23 Kasparov played a sacrifice that he thought would win the game and the match, but Karpov found a refutation on move 53 and won the game a few moves later, leaving Kasparov needing to win the final game to retain his title. In a tense and dramatic 24th game, Karpov ran low on thinking time and Kasparov seized a chance to sacrifice a pawn for an attack. In desperate time pressure Karpov missed the best defence and by the time the game was adjourned on move 42 Kasparov was a pawn up. Exploiting another mistake by Karpov in the second session of play, Kasparov slowly built his advantage until Karpov resigned on move 64. The match thus ended in a 12–12 tie, with Kasparov remaining World Champion.

{| class="wikitable" style="text-align:center"
|+World Chess Championship Match 1987
|-
! !! Rating !! 1 !! 2 !! 3 !! 4 !! 5 !! 6 !! 7 !! 8 !! 9 !! 10 !! 11 !! 12 !! 13 !! 14 !! 15 !! 16 !! 17 !! 18 !! 19 !! 20 !! 21 !! 22 !! 23 !! 24 !!  Points
|-
| align=left |  || 2740
| style="background:black; color:white"|½ || 0 ||style="background:black; color:white"|½ || 1 ||style="background:black; color:white"|0 || ½ ||style="background:black; color:white"|½ || 1 ||style="background:black; color:white"|½ || ½ ||style="background:black; color:white"|1 || ½ ||style="background:black; color:white"|½ || ½ ||style="background:black; color:white"|½ || 0 ||style="background:black; color:white"|½ || ½ ||style="background:black; color:white"|½ || ½ ||style="background:black; color:white"|½ || ½ ||style="background:black; color:white"|0 || 1 || 12
|-
| align=left |  || 2700
| ½ ||style="background:black; color:white"|1 || ½ || style="background:black; color:white"|0 || 1 || style="background:black; color:white"|½ || ½ ||style="background:black; color:white"|0 || ½ ||style="background:black; color:white"|½ || 0 ||style="background:black; color:white"|½ || ½ || style="background:black; color:white"|½ || ½ ||style="background:black; color:white"|1 || ½ ||style="background:black; color:white"| ½ || ½ || style="background:black; color:white"|½ || ½ || style="background:black; color:white"|½ || 1 || style="background:black; color:white"|0 ||12
|}

References

External links
All games at chessgames.com
1987 World Chess Championship at the Internet Archive record of Graeme Cree's Chess Pages

1987
1987 in chess
1987 in Spanish sport
Sports competitions in Seville
Garry Kasparov